The women's 60 metres hurdles event at the 2015 European Athletics Indoor Championships was held on 6 March 2015 at 10:05 (heats), 16:00 (semifinals) and 18:35 (final) local time.

Medalists

Results

Heats
Qualification: First 3 of each heat (Q) and the next 4 fastest (q) qualified for the semifinals.

Semifinals
Qualification: First 4 of each semifinal (Q) qualified directly for the final.

Final

References

2015 European Athletics Indoor Championships
60 metres hurdles at the European Athletics Indoor Championships
2015 in women's athletics